The Peasall Sisters are a country harmony group formed by three of the six Peasall siblings. They are best known for their singing in the 2000 film O Brother, Where Art Thou?.

Biography
The six Peasall siblings were born and raised in White House, Tennessee. Group members include Sarah (alto voice, guitar), Hannah (soprano voice, mandolin), and Leah (tenor voice, violin).

Film participation
In the 2000 film O Brother, Where Art Thou?, they provided the singing voices for Ulysses Everett McGill's (George Clooney) daughters, the Wharvey Girls. They sang "In the Highways" and "Angel Band".

The Peasall Sisters – Family Harmony DVD was released in 2006, and shows the sisters with their family and singing.

For the soundtrack of the 2010 film True Grit, the sisters contribute their version of Mosie Lister's gospel song "Where No One Stands Alone".

Appearances
As part of the Down from the Mountain tour, the sisters performed at the Radio City Music Hall and Carnegie Hall. They have also appeared at the Grand Ole Opry.

Awards
Their inclusion on the O Brother, Where Art Thou? soundtrack album made the group the youngest vocal group nominated for a contribution to a winner of the Grammy Award for Album of the Year. Their win in the category made Leah Peasall the youngest Grammy winner in history at 8 years old.

Recordings
The sisters have released two albums: in 2002, First Offering and in 2005 Home to You, on which they are accompanied by artists such as Randy Scruggs, Larry Perkins, Jamie Hartford, and Leroy Troy.

Discography
Solo albums
 2002: First Offering (Varèse Sarabande)
 2005: Home To You (Dualtone)

Music films
 2006: The Peasall Sisters: Family Harmony DVD (Franklin Films)

Film contributions
 2000: O Brother, Where Art Thou? (Lost Highway / Mercury) - "In the Highways" (in movie and soundtrack album); "Angel Band" (in movie, not on soundtrack album)
 2010: True Grit - "Where No One Stands Alone" (featured in movie and trailer)

Song contributions
 2002: "Bob and Larry's Backyard Party" (Leah Peasall only)
 2003: "O Veggie Where Art Thou?"
 2007: Various artists - Anchored in Love: A Tribute to June Carter Cash (Dualtone) - track 8, "Road To Kaintuck" (with Billy Bob Thornton)
 2015: Various artists - The Unbroken Circle (The Musical Heritage of the Carter Family) (Dualtone) - track 3, "On the Sea of Galilee" (with Emmylou Harris)

References

External links
 
 

American country music groups
Grammy Award winners
Sibling musical trios
American musical trios